This category is for non-Maltese footballers who currently play or have played in any of the Maltese leagues.  The list includes also players that earned Maltese nationality during the years since being Maltese or marrying a Maltese wife.  Players with two different nationalities are written in both of the countries.
(As to January 19, 2010)

Albania 
 Fatos Daja
 Vilson Caushi
 Renis Hyka
 Edmond Lufi

Angola 
 Mawete Júnior

Argentina 
 Julio Alcorsé
 Walter Acevedo
 Rodrigo Cariaga
 Pablo Doffo
 Cesar Paiber

Australia 
 Leighton Grech
 Daniel Severino

Benin 
 Florent Raimy
 Salomon Wisdom

Bosnia and Herzegovina 
 Sanin Ortas
 Siniša Radak
 Senad Repuh

Brazil 
 Anderson
 André Rocha da Silva
 Bizú
 Camilo
 Daniel Mariano Bueno
 Denni
 Elton Morelato
 Éverson
 Éverton
 Italo Nogueira
 Ivan
 Marcelo Pereira
 Marcos Aurélio
 Marco Morgon
 Michael Douglas Lima
 Pedrinho
 Ramón
 Renato Conceição
 Wendell Gomes

Bulgaria 
 Sasho Angelov
 Hari Borislavov
 Valeri Bojinov
 Martin Deanov
 Peycho Deliminkov
 Nikolay Kirilov
 Dragomir Draganov
 Rumen Galabov
 Stanimir Georgiev
 Svetlan Kondev
 Milen Penchev
 Nikola Slavtchev
 Mitko Trendafilov
 Emil Yanchev
 Borislav Giorev
 Krasimir Manolov

Burkina Faso 
 Ousseni Zongo
 Saïdou Panandétiguiri

Cameroon 
 Ernest Nfor

Central African Republic 
 Boris Sandjo
 Marcelin Tamboulas

Congo 
 Rufin Oba

Costa Rica 
 Victor Coto Ortega
 Windell Gabriels

Curaçao 
 Richmar Siberie

Czech Republic 
 Petr Bartes
 Martin Klein
 Pavel Mraz

Denmark 
 Ronni Hartvig
 Carl Zachhau

Dominican Republic 
 Enmy Peña

DR Congo 
 Yannick Bolasie
 Landry Mulemo

England 
 Chris Bart-Williams
 Mark Briggs
 Nathan Charnock
 Barry Gallagher
 Peter Hatch
 Paul Mariner
 Tony Morley
 Carl Saunders
 Donovan Simmonds
 Kris Thackray

Equatorial Guinea 
 Eloy Edu
 David García Mitogo
 Diosdado Mbele
 Rui Da Gracia

Finland 
 Pekka Helin
 Timo Paasolainen

France 
 Amed Davy Sylla

Georgia 
 Grigol Gvazava

Germany 
 Heiner Backhaus

Ghana 

 Asante Agyemang

 Abudulai Issaka
Nii Nortey Ashong
Elvis Sakyi

Guinea-Bissau 
 Arnaud Mendy

Hungary 
 Attila Filkor
 Györgyi Handel

Ireland 
 Declan O'Brien

Italy 
 Cristiano Bergodi
 Domenico Di Carlo
 Mauro Di Lello
 Christian Terlizzi
 Paltemio Barbetti
 Andrea Pisanu
 Fabrizio Miccoli
 Cristian Zaccardo

Jamaica 
 Nathan Koo-Boothe

Latvia 
 Maksims Daņilovs
 Oļegs Malašenoks

Lithuania 
 Donatas Vencevicius

Macedonia 
 Darko Krsteski
 Borče Manevski

Mali 
 Souleymane Diamoutène

Moldova 
 Andrian Caşcaval
 Nicolae Milinceanu

Montenegro 
 Aleksandar Madžar
 Nikola Bogdanović
 Draško Braunović
 Ivan Janjušević
 Bojan Kaljević

Netherlands 
 Sylvano Comvalius
 Jordi Cruyff
 Geert den Ouden

New Zealand 
 Kim Wright

Nigeria 
 Olomuyiwa Agonun
 Murphy Akanji
 Akanni-Sunday Wasiu
 Minabo Asechemie
 Ibrahim Babatunde
 Haruna Babangida
 Ndubisi Chukunyere
 Haruna Doda
 Sunday Eboh
 Augustine Eguavoen
 Anthony Ewurum
 Anthony Evi Parker
 Precious Monye
 Essien Mbong
 Benneth Njoku
 Chidoze Nwankwo
 Jeremiah Ani
 Daniel Nwoke
 Emeka Ochei
 Uwa Ogbodo
 Joseph Okonkwo
 Chris Oretan
 Frank Temile
 Omonigho Temile
 Edafe Uzeh

Oman 
 Raed Ibrahim Saleh

Portugal 
 Nuno Gomes
 Miguel Nimes Lopes De Pina
 Zeferino

Romania 
 Lucian Dronca
 Marius Filipref
 Alexandru Pavel
 Adrian Popescu

Russia 
 Viktor Zlydarev

Scotland 
 Derek Collins
 Malcolm Robertson
 Gary Muir
 Carlo Monti

Serbia 
 Andjelko Djuričić
 Danilo Dončić
 Dejan Maksić
 Zoran Levnaić
 Đorđe Pintac
 Robert Savić
 Bojan Mamić

Somalia 
 Ciise Aadan Abshir

Spain 
 Jorge Mora

Sweden 

 Andre Grabowski

Tunisia 
 Ridha Dardouri
 Abdelkarim Nafti

Ukraine 
 Oleksandr Maksymov

United Arab Emirates 
 Hamdan Al-Kamali

Uruguay 
 Christian Callejas

References

Notes

Malta

Association football player non-biographical articles